Damien O'Hagan is a former Gaelic footballer who played at senior level for the Tyrone county team. He played for his county at minor, under-21 and senior levels. While he was playing for Tyrone, the county won three Ulster Senior Football Championship (SFC) titles but never won the All-Ireland Senior Football Championship. He won an All Star Award in 1986, when he was part of the first Tyrone team to reach the All-Ireland SFC final, lost to Kerry by a scoreline of 2–15 to 1–10.

Early life
O'Hagan's father, John Joe, was also a footballer, winning two All-Ireland Minor Football Championship medals and two Ulster SFC titles. O'Hagan went to trials for his father's club, Clonoe, at the age of ten. He did not get into the team and was later asked to join Coalisland na Fianna, where he would go on to have successful club career. In recent years, however, O'Hagan has been highly critical of Coalisland GAA.

Honours

Inter-county
Ulster Senior Football Championship (3): 1984,1986,1989
Ulster U-21 Football Championship (1): 1980
Ulster Minor Football Championship (3): 1975,1976,1978

Inter-provincial
Railway cup (2): 1989,1991

Club
Cork Junior Football Championship (1): 1979
Tyrone Intermediate Football Championship (1): 1984
Tyrone Intermediate Football League (1): 1984
Tyrone Senior Football Championship (2): 1989, 1990
Tyrone Senior Football League (1): 1991

References

Year of birth missing (living people)
Living people
Tyrone inter-county Gaelic footballers